You've Got a Friend is an album by American pop singer Johnny Mathis that was released on August 11, 1971, by Columbia Records.  The phrase "Today's Great Hits" can be found above the title on both sides of the record jacket as well as both sides of the LP label as if to emphasize that this is essentially an album covering songs that were recently on the charts. This was a common practice of many vocalists of the period, so much so in fact that fellow Columbia artist Andy Williams also released an album titled You've Got a Friend in August 1971 on which he coincidentally covers seven of the 11 tracks that Mathis recorded for this album.

The Mathis record made its first appearance on Billboard magazine's Top LP's & Tapes chart in the issue dated September 4, 1971, and remained there for 10 weeks, peaking at number 80.

The single from this album, "If We Only Have Love", was projected to be a hit in the "Top 60 Pop Spotlight" in the issue of Billboard dated October 9, 1971, and was listed as a "Pick Single" in the magazine's February 26, 1972, issue but failed to reach either its Hot 100 or Easy Listening charts.

Reception

In their review for retailers, Billboard wrote, "Mathis is a consistent heavy chart seller with his packages, all of which are super performances, but this one tops the others."

Track listing

Side one
 "You've Got a Friend" (Carole King) – 4:31
 "How Can You Mend a Broken Heart?" (Barry Gibb, Robin Gibb) – 3:16
 "Help Me Make It Through the Night" (Kris Kristofferson) – 3:16
 "If You Could Read My Mind" (Gordon Lightfoot) – 4:01
 "Never Can Say Goodbye" (Clifton Davis) – 3:07

Side two
 "It's Too Late" (Carole King) – 3:07
 "We Can Work It Out" (John Lennon, Paul McCartney) – 3:03
 "Long Ago and Far Away" (James Taylor) – 3:11
 "If" (David Gates) – 3:03
 "For All We Know" from Lovers and Other Strangers (Jimmy Griffin, Fred Karlin, Robb Royer) – 2:54
 "If We Only Have Love" (Eric Blau, Jacques Brel, Mort Shuman) – 3:16

2017 CD bonus tracks
This album's CD release as part of the 2017 box set The Voice of Romance: The Columbia Original Album Collection included four bonus tracks that were previously unavailable:
"Reach Out I'll Be There" (Holland–Dozier–Holland) – 4:03
"So Much in Love" (Marjorie Goetschius, Jascha Heifetz) – 4:02
"I Only Have Eyes for You" from Dames (Al Dubin, Harry Warren) – 3:43
"Golden Slumbers" (Lennon, McCartney) – 3:30

Recording dates
From the liner notes for The Voice of Romance: The Columbia Original Album Collection:
April 30, 1971 – "For All We Know", "If"
May 5, 1971 – "Help Me Make It Through the Night", "Never Can Say Goodbye", "Reach Out I'll Be There"
May 7, 1971 – "If You Could Read My Mind", "Long Ago and Far Away", "So Much in Love"
May 11, 1971 – "Golden Slumbers", "I Only Have Eyes for You", "We Can Work It Out"
June 30, 1971 – "How Can You Mend a Broken Heart?", "It's Too Late", "You've Got a Friend"
July 8, 1971 – "If We Only Have Love"

Song information

As the songwriter of "You've Got a Friend", Carole King won the Grammy Award for Song of the Year, but it was James Taylor's recording of the song that spent a week at number one on both the Billboard Hot 100 and Easy Listening charts, reached number four on the UK singles chart, received Gold certification from the Recording Industry Association of America, and earned Taylor the Grammy for Best Vocal Performance, Male. "How Can You Mend a Broken Heart?" by the Bee Gees spent four weeks at number one on the Hot 100 and reached number four on the Easy Listening chart in addition to receiving Gold certification from the RIAA.  "Help Me Make It Through the Night" also won Grammys for both its songwriter and vocalist, in this case Kris Kristofferson winning Best Country Song and Sammi Smith picking up Best Country Vocal Performance, Female in addition to spending three weeks at number one on Billboard'''s Country chart, reaching number eight pop and number three Easy Listening, and receiving Gold certification.

Gordon Lightfoot's "If You Could Read My Mind" enjoyed a week at number one on the Easy Listening chart and got as high as number five on the Hot 100 and number 30 in the UK. The Jackson 5 had the most successful version of "Never Can Say Goodbye" with three weeks at number two on the pop chart, three weeks at number one R&B, and a number 33 hit in the UK. Carole King won the Grammy Award for Record of the Year for "It's Too Late", which racked up five weeks at number one on both the pop and Easy Listening charts, went to number six UK, and received Gold certification.

The Beatles took "We Can Work It Out" to number one for three weeks on the Billboard Hot 100 and earned a Gold record for the recording. "Long Ago and Far Away" by James Taylor made it to number 31 pop and number four Easy Listening. Bread went to number four on the Hot 100 with "If", which also spent three weeks at number one on the Easy Listening chart. The 1970 song "For All We Know" originated in the film Lovers and Other Strangers'' and won the Oscar for Best Original Song two months after its chart debut by The Carpenters, who made it to number three pop with the song and spent three weeks at number one Easy Listening.

Personnel

Johnny Mathis - producer ("You've Got a Friend", "How Can You Mend a Broken Heart?", "It's Too Late", "If We Only Have Love"); vocals
Richard Perry - producer (except as noted)
Jack Gold - producer ("If", "For All We Know")
Al Capps - arranger ("If", "For All We Know")
D'Arneill Pershing - arranger (except as noted)
Roy M. Rogosin - conductor
Peter Romano - engineer
Phil Macy - engineer
Guy Webster - front and back cover photos
Virginia Team - design

References

Bibliography

 

1971 albums
Johnny Mathis albums
Albums produced by Richard Perry
Columbia Records albums